The Xerox Classic was a golf tournament on the Nationwide Tour from 2005 to 2008. It was played in August at Irondequoit Country Club in Rochester, New York, United States.

The 2008 purse was $600,000, with $108,000 going to the winner.

Winners

Bolded golfers graduated to the PGA Tour via the final Nationwide Tour money list. Flanagan earned an immediate promotion due to it being his third win of the season.

External links
PGATOUR.com tournament site
Official website

Former Korn Ferry Tour events
Golf in New York (state)
Sports in Rochester, New York
Recurring sporting events established in 2005
Recurring sporting events disestablished in 2008
2005 establishments in New York (state)
2008 disestablishments in New York (state)